was a town located in Ogi District, Saga Prefecture, Japan. The status of Ashikari was changed from a village to a town on April 1, 1967.

As of 2003, the town had an estimated population of 6,203 and a density of 372.11 persons per km2. The total area was 16.67 km2.

On March 1, 2005, Ashikari, along with the towns of Ogi (former), Mikatsuki and Ushizu (all from Ogi District), was merged to create the city of Ogi.

References 

Dissolved municipalities of Saga Prefecture